This is a list of baseball players who went directly to the major leagues.  They are distinguished as a group by the fact that they made their North American professional debut with a Major League Baseball franchise without previously having played at the professional level (excluding fall leagues and winter leagues), such as minor league affiliates of major league teams, the Negro leagues, Japanese professional leagues, or independent professional teams.

After their major league debuts, many of these players played in professional leagues other than Major League Baseball. Included are the Bonus Babies, who joined major league rosters from 1947 to 1957 and from 1962 to 1965 under the Bonus Rule.

The practice of players going directly to the majors has become increasingly rare since the Major League Baseball draft was instituted in 1965; it has only occurred nine times since 1980, and only three times since 2000.

Players

Notes 
General

Inline citations

Major League Baseball lists